K. Ponnusamy is an Indian politician and incumbent member of the Tamil Nadu Legislative Assembly from the Dharapuram constituency. He represents the Anna Dravida Munnetra Kazhagam party.

References 

All India Anna Dravida Munnetra Kazhagam politicians
Living people
1954 births
Tamil Nadu MLAs 1991–1996